Microrca is a monotypic snout moth genus containing only the species Microrca bistrialis. It was described by Hans Georg Amsel in 1956 and is found in Venezuela.

References

Taxa named by Hans Georg Amsel
Chrysauginae
Monotypic moth genera
Moths of South America
Pyralidae genera